Moisil is a Romanian surname that may refer to:

Constantin Moisil (1876–1958), historian
Grigore Moisil (1906–1973), mathematician and computer scientist, son of Constantin
Iuliu Moisil (1859–1947), schoolteacher and writer, uncle of Constantin
Grigore Moisil National College of Computer Science (Brașov)
Łukasiewicz–Moisil algebra

Romanian-language surnames